Mahiyangana Raja Maha Vihara is an ancient Buddhist temple in Mahiyangana, Sri Lanka. It is believed to be the site of Gautama Buddha's first visit to the country, and is one of the Solosmasthana, the 16 sacred religious locations in Sri Lanka. Currently this temple has been declared as one of archaeological site in Sri Lanka.

Buddha's visit
Historical sources, including the ancient chronicle Mahavamsa, a record that the Buddha visited the Mahiyangana area in the ninth month after he attained enlightenment, which was his first visit to the country. According to the Mahavamsa, Sri Lanka was inhabited by yakshas at the time. It says that the Buddha subdued the yakshas there and held a discourse on Dhamma with them. They were then sent to an island named Giri so that the country would be "purified" and Buddhism could be established there later on, where it would prevail "in all its glory".

History
A Yakka chieftain named Saman (who is now regarded as a deity) attained Sotāpanna (Sovan) after listening to the Buddha's discourse, and asked for a token from the Buddha that they could worship in his absence. The Buddha had given him a handful of hair from his head, which Saman later enshrined in a small stupa,  in height. This was the first stupa to be built in Sri Lanka.

According to the Mahawansa, King Devanampiyatissa caused his brother Moolabhaya to deposit the relic of Griwah-Dawtoe (a neck bone) and enlarge it to a height of 30 Cubits. 

Other rulers such as Voharika Tissa, Sena II, Vijayabahu I and Kirti Sri Rajasinha have carried out repairs and maintenance work at the temple. In 1942, a society was formed for the renovation of the temple under D. S. Senanayake. Reconstruction work began in 1953 and ended in 1980 with the completion of a new pinnacle for the stupa.

Images

See also
List of Archaeological Protected Monuments in Sri Lanka

References

External links

 Official Facebook Page - Mahiyanganaya Rajamaha Viharaya
 Official YouTube Channel - Mahiyanganaya Rajamaha Viharaya
 Mahiyanganaya Esala Perahara
 Mahiyangana Rajamaha Viharaya - Official Website
 Mahiyangana Cetiya - the first of its kind in Sri Lanka
 Restoration of Mahiyangana stupa begins
 Miyuguna Seya the first Dagaba in Sri Lanka
 Mahiyangana Cetiya - the first of its kind in Sri Lanka
 The first place visited by Buddha
 First ever stupa built by an Arhant
 EARLY & MIDDLE HISTORICAL PERIODS: 250BC - 1250AD

Buddhist temples in Badulla District
Stupas in Sri Lanka
Archaeological protected monuments in Badulla District